College Ward or Ward 8 (French: Quartier Collège) is a city ward in Ottawa, Canada's west end. The ward covers the neighbourhoods of Bells Corners, Qualicum, Graham Park, Leslie Park, Redwood, Kenson Park, Parkway Park, Bel-Air Park, Bel-Air Heights, Braemar Park, Copeland Park, Briargreen, Centrepointe, Navaho, City View, Ryan Farm, Meadowlands and Crestview.

Prior to the 2006 election, College Ward was known as Baseline Ward, and didn't include Bells Corners. It was incorporated into the city with amalgamation in 2001 (elections were held in 2000). Previously, the ward existed on the earlier Ottawa-Carleton Regional Council. The ward is represented on city council by Laine Johnson. The ward has an estimated population of 55,000 (2006) and an area of 46.2 km2. The ward is named for Algonquin College.

Prior to amalgamation, the area now covered by College Ward in Ottawa's west end was in Carleton Ward. It was created in 1950, when Ottawa's west end was annexed from Nepean Township. The ward eventually became smaller and smaller, and by 1972 it only consisted of the area south of the Queensway and west of Clyde Avenue.

City councillors
Frank Boyce (1950–1958)
Howard Henry (1950–1969)
Lloyd Francis (1959–1960)
Frank Boyce (1961–1964)
Maurice Egan (1965–1967)
Lloyd Francis (1968–1969)
Ralph Sutherland (1970–1972)
Bill Law (1970–1974)
Toddy Kehoe (1975–1985)
Bob Morrison (1985–1988)
Tim Kehoe (1988–1994)
Brian Mackey (1994–2000)
Rick Chiarelli (2001–2022)
Laine Johnson (2022-present)

Election results

1949 special election
Two aldermen elected for the newly created Carleton Ward

1950
Two to be elected

1952
Two to be elected

1954
Two to be elected

1956
Two to be elected

1958
Two to be elected

1960
Two to be elected

1962
Two to be elected

1964
Two to be elected

1966
Two to be elected

1969
Two to be elected

1972

1974

1976

1978

1980

1982

1985

1988

1991

1994

1997

2000

2003

2006
Longtime incumbent Rick Chiarelli faced opposition from Brett Delmage a software developer, and activist Laura Lee Doupe.

2010

2014

2018

2022

References

External links
 Map of College Ward

Ottawa wards